Good News is the fifth studio album by Canadian jazz singer Matt Dusk. It was released by Royal Crown Records on October 27, 2009. The album is a departure from previous Matt Dusk standard, having influences of Palm Beach Pop and crooner standards of the 1950s in a modern feel. The albums is filled with original tracks, plus a bonus classic available in Canada and on iTunes in the standard and deluxe edition.

Track listing

Personnel 
Per liner notes
 Matt Dusk – vocals, backing vocals, keyboard, producer
 Ron Lopata – bass guitar, keyboard, producer
 Jukka Immonen – keyboard, co-producer
 Terry Sawchuk – mixing engineer
 Richard Dodd – mastering engineer

Additional musicians
 Joel Parisien – backing vocals
 Quisha Wint – backing vocals
 Justin Abedin – guitar
 Davide Direnzo – drums, percussion
 Ross Macintyre – bass guitar
 Alex Kundakcioglu – trumpet
 Rob Somerville – trombone
 Chris Gale – alto sax, bari sax, horn arrangements
 Steve Macdonald – tenor sax, horn arrangements
 Singleton Chamber Orchestra – strings
 Lucian Piane – horn arrangements
 Shelly Berger – horn arrangements
 Kevin Fox – string arrangements

Charts and certifications

Charts

Certifications

References

2009 albums
Matt Dusk albums